"Used 2" is a song by American rapper 2 Chainz from his second studio album B.O.A.T.S. II: Me Time (2013). Produced and co-written by Mannie Fresh, it was released as the second single from the album on September 18, 2013.

Background
The song was produced by former Cash Money Records in-house producer Mannie Fresh and features 2 Chainz paying homage to Juvenile's flow on his 1998 song "Back That Azz Up".

Music video
The music video for "Used 2" was directed by Marc Klasfeld and filmed on September 26, 2013 in New Orleans, Louisiana. Released on October 13, 2013, the video features appearances from Mannie Fresh and, notably, three reunited members of New Orleans hip hop group Hot Boys—Juvenile, Turk and Lil Wayne. Hot Boys member B.G. is not featured in the video. In place, 2 Chainz holds up a red T-shirt reading "Free B.G." in the video.

Release and live performances
2 Chainz announced the release of "Used 2" as the second single from B.O.A.T.S. II: Me Time on September 17, 2013. The following day, the single impacted mainstream urban radio in the United States. "Used 2" was serviced to urban contemporary radio in the United Kingdom on September 26, and it was subsequently added to the playlist of British urban radio station BBC Radio 1Xtra. 2 Chainz later performed "Used 2" with the track's producer Mannie Fresh at the 2013 BET Hip Hop Awards. Following its single release, "Used 2" debuted at numbers 11 and 44 respectively on the Billboard Bubbling Under Hot 100 Singles and Hot R&B/Hip-Hop Songs charts.

Charts

Release history

References

2013 songs
2013 singles
2 Chainz songs
Song recordings produced by Mannie Fresh
Songs written by 2 Chainz
Def Jam Recordings singles
Songs written by Mannie Fresh